This list of the prehistoric life of Alabama contains the various prehistoric life-forms whose fossilized remains have been reported from within the US state of Alabama.

Precambrian
The Paleobiology Database records no known occurrences of Precambrian fossils in Alabama.

Paleozoic

Selected Paleozoic taxa of Alabama
  †Alethopteris
 †Alethopteris lonchitica
 †Alethopteris valida
 †Amphiscapha – tentative report
 †Amplexopora
 †Annularia
 †Annularia radiata
 †Annularia sphenophylloides
 †Arenicolites
 †Artisia
 †Atrypa
 †Aviculopecten
 †Bimuria
  †Calamites
 †Calamites cisti
 †Calamites goepperti
 †Calamites suckowi
 †Calamites suckowii
 †Calamites undulatus
 †Campbelloceras
 †Caninia
 †Carinamala
 †Cavusgnathus
  †Cedaria
 †Christiania
 †Cladodus – report made of unidentified related form or using admittedly obsolete nomenclature
  †Cleiothyridina
 †Composita
 †Composita subquadrata
 †Conocardium
 †Cordaites
 †Cornulites
 †Crania
 †Crepipora
  †Ctenacanthus
 †Ctenacanthus elegans
 †Ctenerpeton
 †Cyclopteris
 †Cystodictya
 †Decadocrinus
 †Deiracephalus
 †Dicoelosia
 †Diplichnites
 †Diplichnites gouldi
 †Dolorthoceras
 †Fenestella
 †Girvanella
 †Glyptagnostus
  †Glyptagnostus reticulatus
  †Gnathodus
 †Gnathodus bilineatus
 †Hindeodus
 †Hindeodus minutus
 †Innitagnostus
 †Kingstonia
 †Kingstonia appalachia
 †Kouphichnium
  †Lepidodendron
 †Lepidodendron aculeatum
 †Lepidodendron obovatum
 †Lepidostrobus
 †Limnosaurus – type locality for genus
 †Lingulella
 †Lingulella alabamensis
 †Lingulella lirata
 †Lingulella pachyderma
 †Lochriea
 †Lyginopteris
 †Lyginopteris hoeninghausi
 †Meristina – tentative report
 †Naticopsis
 Nucula
 †Obolus
 †Paladin
  †Pecopteris
 †Pecopteris arborescens
 †Pentremites
 †Pentremites laminatus
 †Pentremites tulipaformis
 †Petalodus – tentative report
 †Pinnularia
 †Platyceras
 †Platycrinites
 †Rachis
  †Sigillaria
 †Sigillaria elegans
 †Sigillaria ichthyolepis
 †Sigillaria scutella
 †Sigillaria scutellata
 †Skenidioides
 †Solenopora
 †Sphenophyllum
 †Sphenophyllum cuneifolium
 †Sphenophyllum emarginatum
  †Sphenopteris
 †Sphenopteris brongniarti
 †Sphenopteris elegans
 †Sphenopteris herbacea
 †Sphenopteris pottsvillea
 †Sphenopteris pseudocristata
 †Sphenopteris schatzlarensis
 Spirorbis
 †Treptichnus
 †Undichna

Mesozoic

Selected Mesozoic taxa of Alabama
 Acirsa
 Acmaea
  †Acteon
 †Agerostrea
 †Albertosaurus
 †Albula
 †Ampullina
 †Ancilla
 †Anomia
 †Anomoeodus
  †Appalachiosaurus – type locality for genus
 †Appalachiosaurus montgomeriensis – type locality for species
 Arca
 Architectonica
 Arrhoges
 Astarte
 †Avellana
  †Avitelmessus
 †Avitelmessus grapsoideus
  †Baculites
 †Baculites arculus
 †Baculites asper – or unidentified comparable form
 †Baculites capensis
 †Baculites tippahensis
 †Bananogmius
 †Bananogmius crieleyi – type locality for species
 †Bananogmius zitteli – or unidentified comparable form
 †Banis
 Barbatia
 †Belemnitella
 †Belemnitella americana
 †Belemnitida
  †Belonostomus
 Botula
 †Botula carolinensis
 †Botula conchafodentis
 †Botula ripleyana
 Brachidontes – tentative report
 †Bulla – tentative report
 Cadulus
 Caestocorbula
 †Caestocorbula crassaplica
 †Caestocorbula crassiplica
 †Caestocorbula percompressa
 †Caestocorbula suffalciata
 †Caestocorbula terramaria
 Callianassa
 †Callianassa mortoni
 †Calliomphalus
 †Calliomphalus americanus
 †Calliomphalus nudus
 Calyptraea
  Capulus
 †Caveola
 Cerithiella
 †Cerithiella nodoliratum – or unidentified related form
 †Cerithiella semirugatum
 Cerithiopsis
  Cerithium
 Charonia
 †Chelosphargis
 †Chelosphargis advena – or unidentified comparable form
 Chlamys
 †Chondrites
 Cidaris
  †Cimolichthys
 †Cimolichthys nepaholica
 Clavagella
  †Clidastes
 †Clidastes liodontus
 †Clidastes propython – type locality for species
 Cliona
 Corbula
 †Corsochelys – type locality for genus
 Crassostrea
 †Crenella
 †Crenella elegantula
 †Crenella senica
 †Crenella serica
 †Cretolamna
 †Cretolamna appendiculata
  †Cretoxyrhina
 †Cretoxyrhina mantelli
 Crucibulum
 Ctenochelys – type locality for genus
 †Ctenochelys acris – type locality for species
 †Ctenochelys tenuitesta – type locality for species
  Cucullaea
 †Cucullaea capax
 †Cucullaea littlei
 †Cucullaea powersi – or unidentified comparable form
 Cuspidaria
 †Cuspidaria ampulla
 †Cuspidaria grandis
 †Cuspidaria grovensis
 †Cuspidaria jerseyensis – or unidentified comparable form
 Cylichna
 †Cylichna diversilirata
 †Cylichna incisa
 †Cymella
 Cypraea – report made of unidentified related form or using admittedly obsolete nomenclature
 Dasmosmilia
 †Dasmosmilia kochii
 †Dasmosmilia reesidi
  †Dentalium
 †Dentalium leve
 †Dentalium pauperculum
 †Dentalium ripleyana
 †Discosaurus
 †Discosaurus vetustus
  †Discoscaphites
 †Discoscaphites conradi
 †Discoscaphites iris
 †Dolicholatirus
 †Ecphora
 Edaphodon
 †Edaphodon barberi – type locality for species
 †Edaphodon mirificus
 †Enchodus
 †Enchodus petrosus
 †Enchodus saevus – or unidentified comparable form
  †Eotrachodon – type locality for genus
 †Eotrachodon orientalis – type locality for species
 †Epitonium
 †Epitonium sillimani
 †Eulima
 †Eulima gracilistylis
 †Eulima monmouthensis
 †Euspira
 †Eutrephoceras
  †Exogyra
 †Exogyra costata
 †Exogyra ponderosa
 †Exogyra upatoiensis
 Fusinus
 †Gegania
 Gemmula
 †Gervillia
  †Globidens – type locality for genus
 †Globidens alabamensis – type locality for species
 Glossus
 Glycymeris
 †Glycymeris hamula
 †Glycymeris rotundata
 †Glycymeris subaustralis
 †Halimornis – type locality for genus
 †Halimornis thompsoni – type locality for species
  †Halisaurus
 †Halisaurus sternbergi
 †Hamulus
 Haustator
 †Helicoceras
 Hoplopteryx – tentative report
 †Hybodus
 †Ichthyodectes
 †Ichthyodectes ctenodon – or unidentified comparable form
  †Ichthyornis – type locality for genus 
 †Ichthyornis dispar – type locality for species
 †Inoceramus
 †Ischyrhiza
 †Ischyrhiza mira
 Isognomon
 Lima
 Limatula
 †Linearis
 †Linter
 †Linthia
 Lithophaga
 Lopha
 †Lopha falcata
 †Lopha mesenterica
 †Lopha ucheensis
  †Lophorhothon – type locality for genus 
 †Lophorhothon atopus – type locality for species
 †Loxotoma
 †Lucina
 Martesia
 †Mathilda
  †Megalocoelacanthus – type locality for genus
 †Megalocoelacanthus dobiei – type locality for species
 Menippe
 †Modiolus
 †Modiolus sedesclaris
 †Modiolus sedesclarus
 †Modiolus trigonus
 †Moorevillia – type locality for genus
 †Morea
 †Neithea
 †Neithea bexarensis
 †Neithea quinquecostata
 †Neithea quinquecostatus
 Nozeba
  Nucula
 †Nucula camia
 †Nucula cuneifrons
 †Nucula percrassa
 †Nucula severnensis
 Odontaspis
 Ostrea
 †Pachydiscus
 †Pachymelania – tentative report
  †Pachyrhizodus
 †Pachyrhizodus caninus
 †Pachyrhizodus kingi
 †Pachyrhizodus minimus
 Pagurus
 †Pagurus convexus – type locality for species
 Panopea
 †Paranomia
 †Pecten
 Pholadomya
 †Pholadomya occidentalis
 †Pholadomya tippana
 †Pinna
 †Placenticeras 
 †Placenticeras benningi
 †Plagiostoma
  †Platecarpus
 Plicatula
 Polinices
  †Polycotylus 
 †Polycotylus latipinnis
 †Prognathodon
 †Protocardia
  †Protosphyraena
 †Protosphyraena nitida – tentative report
  †Protostega 
 †Protostega dixie – type locality for species
 †Protostega gigas
 †Pseudocorax
 †Pseudocorax affinis
 †Pseudocorax laevis
 †Pteria
 †Pterotrigonia
 †Pterotrigonia angulicostata
 †Pterotrigonia cerulea
 †Pterotrigonia eufalensis
 †Pterotrigonia eufaulensis
 †Pterotrigonia thoracica
  †Ptychodus
 †Ptychodus mortoni
 †Ptychodus polygyrus
 †Ptychotrygon
 Pycnodonte
 †Pycnodonte belli
 †Pycnodonte mutabilis
 †Pycnodonte vesicularis
 †Pycnodonte wratheri
 Ringicula
 †Ringicula clarki
 †Ringicula pulchella
 Rissoina
 Rostellaria – tentative report
 †Sargana
 †Saurocephalus
 †Saurocephalus lanciformis – or unidentified comparable form
  †Saurodon
 †Saurodon leanus
 †Saurornitholestes – or unidentified comparable form
 †Scapanorhynchus
 †Scapanorhynchus rapax
 †Scapanorhynchus rhaphiodon
 †Scaphites
 †Schizobasis
  †Selmasaurus – type locality for genus 
 †Selmasaurus russelli – type locality for species
 Serpula
 Solemya
  †Sphenodiscus
 †Sphenodiscus lobatus
 †Sphenodiscus pleurisepta
 †Spirorbula
 Spondylus
  Squalicorax
 †Squalicorax falcatus
 †Squalicorax pristodontus
 †Stratodus
 Teinostoma
 Tellina
 †Tenea
 Teredo
 †Thalassinoides
  †Toxochelys
 Trachycardium
 †Trachycardium efaulense
 †Trachycardium eufaulense
 †Trachycardium eufaulensis
 Turritella
 †Turritella bilira
 †Turritella chalybeatensis
 †Turritella forgemoli – or unidentified comparable form
 †Turritella hilgardi
 †Turritella paravertebroides
 †Turritella tippana
 †Turritella trilira
 †Turritella vertebroides
  †Tylosaurus
 †Tylosaurus zangerli
 Xenophora
 †Xiphactinus
 †Xiphactinus audax

Cenozoic

Selected Cenozoic taxa of Alabama
 Abra
 Acanthocardia
 Accipiter
  †Accipiter striatus
 Acirsa
 Aclis – report made of unidentified related form or using admittedly obsolete nomenclature
 Acropora
 Acteocina
 Acteon
 †Adeorbis – report made of unidentified related form or using admittedly obsolete nomenclature
 Aequipecten
 Aetobatus
 Agaronia
 Alaba
 Albula
 †Allomorone – type locality for genus
  Alopias
 Amaura
 †Ambystoma
 Ampheristus
 †Ampullina
 Amusium
 Anas
 †Anas crecca
 †Anas platyrhynchos
 Ancilla
 Angaria – report made of unidentified related form or using admittedly obsolete nomenclature
 Angulus
 Anodontia
 Anolis
  †Anolis carolinensis
 Anomia
 Antalis
 Apalone
 †Apalone spinifera
  †Aphelops
 Aplodinotus – tentative report
 Aporrhais
 Arca
 Architectonica
  †Arctodus
 †Arctodus simus
 †Area
 Argobuccinum
 Argyrotheca
 Astarte
 Asthenotoma
 Astrangia
 Astyris
 Athleta
 Atrina
  †Aturia
 Atys
 Aythya
 †Aythya collaris
 †Aythya valisineria – or unidentified comparable form
 Bactridium
 †Baculites
 Balanophyllia
  Balanus
 †Baluchicardia
 Barbatia
 Barnea
 Bartramia
 †Bartramia longicauda
  †Basilosaurus
 †Basilosaurus cetoides
 Bathytoma
 †Bathytoma nonplicata – or unidentified comparable form
 †Belosaepia
 Bison
  †Bison antiquus
 Bittium
 Blarina
 †Blarina carolinensis
 Bonasa
 †Bonasa umbellus
 †Bonellitia
 Botula
 †Botula carolinensis
 Brachidontes
 Branta
  †Branta canadensis
 Bufo
 †Bufo americanus
 †Bufo woodhousei
 Bullia
 †Burnhamia
 Busycon
 Cadulus
 Caestocorbula
 Callianassa
  Calliostoma
 Callista
 Calyptraea
 Campanile
 Cancellaria
 †Cancellaria costata
 Canis
  †Canis rufus
 Cantharus
 Capulus
 Carcharhinus
  Carcharias
 Carphophis
 Caryophyllia
  †Castoroides
 †Catenicella
 Catoptrophorus
 †Catoptrophorus semipalmatus
 Centroberyx
 Cerithiella
 Cerithiopsis
 Cerithium – report made of unidentified related form or using admittedly obsolete nomenclature
 Cervus
  †Cervus elaphus
 Chama
 Charonia
 Chiton
 Chlamys
 †Chlorophthalmus – report made of unidentified related form or using admittedly obsolete nomenclature
 Chrysemys
  †Chrysemys picta
 †Chrysodomus – report made of unidentified related form or using admittedly obsolete nomenclature
 Cibicides
 Cidaris
 Cirsotrema
 Clavatula – report made of unidentified related form or using admittedly obsolete nomenclature
  Clavilithes
 Cliona
 Closia
 Clypeaster
 Cochlespira
 Codakia – tentative report
 Colinus
 †Colinus virginianus
 Coluber
 †Coluber constrictor
 Columbellopsis
 Conomitra
 †Conorbis
 Conus
 Corbicula – tentative report
 Corbula
 Cordieria
  †Cormohipparion
 †Corvina
 Corvus
 †Corvus corax
  †Coryphodon
 Crassostrea
 †Crassostrea alabamiensis
 Crenella
 Crepidula
 Crisia
 †Crommium
 Crotalus
 †Crotalus horridus
 Cryptobranchus
  †Cryptobranchus alleganiensis
  Cucullaea
 Cultellus
 Cuna
 Cuspidaria
 Cyanocitta
  †Cyanocitta cristata
 Cygnus
 Cylichna
 †Cylindracanthus
 Cyllene – or unidentified comparable form
  †Cynthiacetus
 Cypraea
 Cypraedia
 †Cytherideis
 Daphnella
 Dasyatis
  Dasypus
 †Dasypus bellus
 Dendrophyllia
 Dentalium
 Desmognathus
 †Desmognathus ochrophaeus
 Diadophis
 †Diadophis punctatus
 Dichocoenia
 †Dinematichthys
  †Dinohyus
 †Dinohyus hollandi – or unidentified related form
  Diodon – tentative report
 Diodora
 Discorbis
 Distorsio
 †Dolicholatirus – tentative report
 Donax
 Dorsanum
 Dosinia – tentative report
 Dumetella
 †Dumetella carolinensis
  †Echinopsis – tentative report
 †Ectopistes
  †Ectopistes migratorius
 †Egertonia
 Elaphe
 †Elaphe guttata – or unidentified comparable form
 †Elaphe vulpina
 †Elimia
 Emarginula
 †Eosurcula
  †Epicyon
 †Epicyon haydeni – or unidentified comparable form
 Epitonium
 Eptesicus
 †Eptesicus fuscus
 Equus
 Ervilia
 Erycina
 Eulima
 Eulimella – report made of unidentified related form or using admittedly obsolete nomenclature
 Eupleura
 †Eurycea
 Euspira
 Euthria
  †Eutrephoceras
 Evalea
 †Exilia
  †Exogyra
 †Exogyra costata
 Falco
 †Falco sparverius
 †Ficopsis
 Fimbria
 Fissurella
 Flabellum
 Fulgurofusus
 Fustiaria
  Galeocerdo
 Galeodea
 Galeorhinus
 Gari
 Gastrochaena
 Gavia
 †Gavia immer
 Gegania
 Gemma
 Genota
 Geodia
  †Georgiacetus
 †Georgiacetus vogtlensis
  †Gigantostrea
 Ginglymostoma
 Glossus
 Glycymeris
 Glyptoactis
 Goniopora
 Graptemys
 †Graptemys geographica
  Grus
 Gyroidina
 Haliaeetus
 †Haliaeetus leucocephalus – or unidentified comparable form
 †Hamulus
 Hastula
 Haustator
 Hemipristis
 †Hemipristis curvatus
 †Hemisurcula
 Heterodon
 †Heterodon platirhinos – or unidentified comparable form
  Heterodontus
 Hexaplex
 Hipponix
 Hyla
 †Hyla gratiosa
 †Hyposaurus
 †Hyposaurus rogersii
 Isognomon
 †Jefitchia
 Kuphus
 †Lacunaria
 Laevicardium
 Lamna
  Lampropeltis
 †Lampropeltis getulus
 †Lampropeltis triangulum
 Latirus
 †Ledina
 Lepton
 Limacina
 Limaria
 Linga
 †Linthia
 †Linuparus
 Lithophaga
 †Lithophaga nigra – or unidentified related form
  Lithophyllum – tentative report
 Lithothamnion – tentative report
 Longchaeus
 Lopha
 Lucina
 Lunularia
 Lynx
 †Lynx rufus
 Macoma
 Macrocallista
 †Mammut
  †Mammut americanum
 †Mammuthus
  †Mammuthus columbi
 Margaretta
 Marginella
 Martesia
 †Mastigophora
 †Mathilda
  †Megalonyx
 †Megalonyx jeffersonii
 Melanella
 Melanerpes
 †Melanerpes carolinus – or unidentified comparable form
 Melanopsis
 Meleagris
  †Meleagris gallopavo
 Membranipora
 Meretrix
 Mergus
 Mesalia
 Mesophyllum
 Metula
 †Michela
 Microdrillia
 Micropora
 Microtus
 †Microtus pennsylvanicus
 Mitrella
 Mitrolumna
 Modiolus
 Murex
 Murexiella
 Myliobatis
  †Mylohyus
 †Mylohyus fossilis
 Myotis
 †Myotis lucifugus
  †Nannippus
 Narona
 Nassarius
 Natica
 Naticarius
 Nebrius
 Negaprion
 †Nemipterus
  †Neohipparion
 Neotoma
 †Neotoma floridana
 Neritina
 Nerodia
 Neverita
 Niso
 Norrisia
 Nucula
 Nycticeius
  †Nycticeius humeralis
 Oculina – type locality for genus
 Odocoileus
  †Odocoileus virginianus
 Odontaspis
 Odostomia
 Oliva
 Olivella
 Opheodrys
 †Opheodrys aestivus
 Ostrea
  †Otodus
 Otus
 †Otus asio
 †Oxyrhina
 †Pachecoa
  †Palaeophis
 Panopea
 Panthera
 †Panthera onca
 Pasithea
 Pecten
 †Pediomeryx
 Pekania
 †Pekania pennanti
 Pelecyora
 Penion
 Peromyscus
 Petricola
 Phalium
 Philine
 Pholadomya
  Pholas
 Phos
 Phyllodus
 Pica
 †Pica pica
  Picoides
 †Picoides villosus – or unidentified comparable form
 Pinna
 Pipistrellus
 Piranga
 †Piranga olivacea – or unidentified comparable form
 Pitar
 †Planaria – report made of unidentified related form or using admittedly obsolete nomenclature
 Planorbis – or unidentified comparable form
 †Pleiolama
 Plethodon
  †Plethodon glutinosus
 Pleurofusia
 Pleuromeris
 †Pleurostoma
 Pleurotomaria – report made of unidentified related form or using admittedly obsolete nomenclature
 Pleurotomella
 Plicatula
 Podilymbus
 †Podilymbus podiceps
  Poirieria
  Polinices
 Polyschides
 Pomatodelphis
 †Pontogeneus
 Porella
 Porina
 †Potamides – report made of unidentified related form or using admittedly obsolete nomenclature
 Pristis
 Propeamussium
 †Protocardia
  †Protohippus
 Prunum
 Pseudemys
 †Pseudolatirus
 Pseudoliva
 Pteria
 Pterothrissus
 Pterynotus
 Pycnodonte
 Pyramidella
 †Pyrgulina
 Quinqueloculina
 Quiscalus
  †Quiscalus quiscula
 Raja
 †Rana
 †Rana catesbeiana
 †Rana pipiens
 Rangifer
  †Rangifer tarandus
 Raphitoma
 Reithrodontomys
 Reteporella
 Retusa
 Rhinobatos
 Rhinoclavis
 Rhinoptera
 Rhizoprionodon
 Rhynchoconger
 Rimella
 Ringicula
  Rissoina
 Rostellaria
 †Rotularia
 Sassia
 Sayornis
  †Sayornis phoebe – or unidentified comparable form
 Scaphander
 Scaphella
 †Sceptrum
 Schizaster
  Schizoporella
 Scolopax
 †Scolopax minor
 Scyliorhinus
 Seila
 Semele
  Serpula
 Serpulorbis
 Siderastrea
 Sigatica
 Sinum
 Siphonalia
 Siphonochelus
 Skena
 Skenea
  †Smilodon
 †Smilodon fatalis
 Solariella
 Solemya
 Sorex
 Sphyraena – tentative report
 Sphyrna
 Spilogale – tentative report
 †Spilogale putorius
 Spirorbis
 †Spirorbula – tentative report
 Spisula
 Spondylus
 Sterna
 Stomachetosella
 Storeria
  †Striatolamia
 Strioturbonilla
 Strix
 †Strix varia – or unidentified comparable form
 Strombus
 Stylophora
 Sveltella
 Sveltia
 Sylvilagus
  †Synthetoceras
 †Synthetoceras tricornatus – or unidentified comparable form
 Tapirus
 Teinostoma
  †Teleoceras
 Tellina
 Temnocidaris – tentative report
 Tenagodus
 Terebra
 Teredo
 Textularia
 Thamnophis
 †Thamnophis sirtalis
 Thiara
 Tornus
 Trachyphyllia
  Trichiurus
 Trigonostoma
 †Trinacria
 Trionyx
 Triphora
 †Tripia
 Trochita
  Trochus – report made of unidentified related form or using admittedly obsolete nomenclature
 Trophon
 Turbinella – or unidentified related form
 Turbo – report made of unidentified related form or using admittedly obsolete nomenclature
 Turbonilla
 Turdus
  †Turdus migratorius
 Turricula
 Turris
 Turritella
 Tylocidaris
 Tympanuchus
 †Tympanuchus cupido
 Umbraculum
 Ursus
  †Ursus americanus
 Venericardia
 Verticordia
 Vitrinella
 †Volvariella
 Xenophora
 Xylophaga
 Yoldia
  †Zygorhiza
 †Zygorhiza kochii – type locality for species

References
 

Alabama